Common names: Omilteman small-headed rattlesnake.
Crotalus intermedius omiltemanus is a venomous pitviper subspecies found in Mexico in the state of Guerrero.

Description
This subspecies can be distinguished from the typical form (C. i. intermedius) by its ventral scale count: 164 or more in males, and 170 or more in females.

Geographic range
Found in Mexico, in Guerrero, in several places west of Chilpancingo, in the Sierra Madre del Sur mountains, including the areas that surround Omilteme, San Vincente, and Filo de Caballo. The type locality given is "Mexico, Omilteme in Guerrero."

References

External links
 

intermedius omiltemanus
Endemic reptiles of Mexico
Reptiles described in 1895
Taxa named by Albert Günther
Fauna of the Sierra Madre del Sur